Bernadette Schild (born 2 January 1990) is a retired World Cup alpine ski racer from Austria.

Born in Zell am See, Salzburg, Schild specialised in slalom and made her World Cup debut in March 2008 at Bormio. She attained her first World Cup podium in March 2013, a second place in slalom at Lenzerheide. Her second podium came nine months later, a third-place finish at Courchevel in December.

She is a younger sister of the champion skier Marlies Raich (b. 1981); they  twice shared a podium during the 2014 season, at Courchevel in December and Kranjska Gora in February.

At the 2014 Olympics, Schild was fourth after the first run in the slalom, but failed to finish the second. In June 2016, she married her trainer, Armin Wierer.

World Cup results

Season standings

Race podiums
 7 podiums – (7 SL); 38 top tens

World Championship results

Olympic results

References

External links
 
 Bernadette Schild World Cup standings at the International Ski Federation
 
 
 Austrian Ski team (ÖSV) – Bernadette Schild – 
 Head Skis – athletes – Bernadette Schild
    
 

1990 births
Austrian female alpine skiers
Alpine skiers at the 2014 Winter Olympics
Alpine skiers at the 2018 Winter Olympics
Olympic alpine skiers of Austria
Living people
People from Zell am See
Sportspeople from Salzburg (state)
20th-century Austrian women
21st-century Austrian women